East Surrey is a constituency represented in the House of Commons of the UK Parliament since 2019 by Claire Coutinho, a Conservative. The seat covers an affluent area in the English county of Surrey.

Since its creation in 1918, East Surrey has elected a Conservative MP on an absolute majority (over 50% of the vote) at every general election, and is therefore regarded as a Conservative safe seat. Its greatest share of the vote for any opposition candidate was 33.75% in February 1974.

Boundaries

1832–1868: The Hundreds of Brixton, Kingston, Reigate, Tandridge and Wallington.

1868–1885: The Hundred of Tandridge, and so much of the Hundred of Wallington as included and lay to the east of the parishes of Croydon and Sanderstead, and so much of the Hundred of Brixton as included and lay to the east of the parishes of Streatham, Clapham and Lambeth.

For period to 1918 see completely new single-member Wimbledon and Reigate seats, also termed N.E. and S.E. Divisions of Surrey.

1918–1950: The Urban Districts of Caterham, and Coulsdon and Purley, and the Rural District of Godstone.

1950–1974: The Urban Districts of Caterham and Warlingham, and Coulsdon and Purley.

1974–1983: The Urban District of Caterham and Warlingham, and the Rural District of Godstone.

1983–1997: The District of Tandridge.  (Equivalent to the above)

1997–2010: The District of Tandridge, and the Borough of Reigate and Banstead wards of Horley East and Horley West.

2010–present: As above plus Horley Central.

Constituency profile

East Surrey is a well-connected inner Home Counties seat, combining the town of Horley with Surrey's residual District Tandridge (as opposed to Boroughs which the other 10 parts have been created) which is made up of Caterham and modest commuter settlements, farming and retirement homes. Horley is one of two towns adjoining London Gatwick Airport and part of Reigate and Banstead borough. The area borders the London Borough of Croydon to the north, the county of Kent to the east, and the county of West Sussex to the south.

The northern part of the seat is inside the M25 motorway — Caterham, Whyteleafe and Warlingham form green-buffered, elevated commuter belt, with good rail connections to Central London and well-connected by all modes of transport to Croydon. Elsewhere, the seat is more rural and includes a low part of the Greensand Ridge and features woodland and many golf courses.

The Conservatives have prevented any opposition party achieving more than 33.75% of the vote since 1974; including at the 1997 and 2001 United Kingdom general elections when opposition was greatest nationally in Conservative safe seats.

Most local wards are won by the Conservatives with the Liberal Democrats often picking up seats somewhere in the dual-council system, particularly in Whyteleafe or Caterham Valley. As is typical in seats of this kind, the Labour vote is typically very modest. The party finished in third place at the elections between 1959 and 2015. In 2017 the party's candidate polled second, in a poorer showing for the Liberal Democrats and the party's "Corbyn Surge". In the 2019 election the Liberal Democrats took second place and Labour fell to third. The area saw a majority vote in favour of Brexit in the 2016 EU Referendum; whereas the then-MP Sam Gyimah opposed Brexit and later joined the Liberal Democrats.

History

Victorian dual-member constituency 1832–1885
The 13th century-created, dual-member constituency for the county took in over a third of today's Greater London and its population far exceeded the average for a county. It was recognised as needing or meriting four MPs, so division, under the Great Reform Act, 1832.

The territory was incepted and absorbed two of three of Surrey's rotten boroughs of Bletchingley and Gatton abolished under the Act.  It overlapped the boroughs of:
Reigate (its double representation halved, which kept a narrow franchise and completely abolished 1868).
Lambeth, to be subdivided in 1885.
Southwark, to be subdivided in 1885.

Often known as the Eastern Division of Surrey or Surrey Eastern, its enfranchised adult male property owners elected two MPs by bloc vote (a voter has a vote for each current vacancy). Notable, clockwise from north, outer reaches were Southwark, Rotherhithe, Addington, Lingfield, Charlwood, Buckland, Surrey, Cheam, Kingston upon Thames and Richmond (see map, top right).

The area was split in two, doubling representation, under the Second Reform Act, starting from the 1868 general election; the area was still under-represented as shown by the setting up of a net increase of 14 metropolitan seats in 1885.

The Redistribution of Seats Act 1885 went much further than the 1832 Act towards equal representation around the country. It here reflected growth in the county's population. Thus for elections from 1885 dual-member West, Mid Surrey and East Surrey dissipated to allow the creation of 16 rather than just 2 metropolitan Surrey seats (Lambeth and Southwark which saw subdivision) and these "county" seats:

The North-Western or Chertsey Division (usually recorded as Chertsey, Surrey N.W. or North-West) – included Woking and Egham
The South-Western or Guildford Division (as style shown above) – included Godalming, Farnham and surrounds
The South-Eastern or Reigate Division (as style shown above) – included Dorking sessional division save for two parishes in No. 4.
The Mid or Epsom Division (as style shown above) – included Kingston's southern and eastern sessional division components
The Kingston Division (invariably Kingston or Kingston-upon-Thames) – included Richmond
The North-Eastern or Wimbledon Division (as style shown above) – included sessional division of Croydon except its core and north in the Metropolis; plus Caterham, Chelsham, Farley, Warlingham.

Seat created in 1918
In 1918 the constituency was re-established in dwarf form, taking rural and nascent very suburban parts of South East Surrey ("Reigate") and North East Surrey ("Wimbledon"), and for the first time electing only one MP. It covered from the south of Croydon to the Kent and West Sussex borders. It was to remain centred on Lingfield, Oxted, Limpsfield, Godstone, Caterham and Woldingham.

In 1950 East Surrey lost Addington parish on the eastern fringe of Croydon to the 1918-formed Croydon South seat, and its southern half to Reigate. In 1974 the north-west of the area became part of Croydon South, reflecting the 1965 transfer of Purley and Coulsdon to the London Borough of Croydon in the new Greater London which then replaced the London County Council. The seat regained essentially the same land as it had lost to Reigate in 1950. Its MP until 1974, William Clark, won the new Croydon South in that year's February election. Clark's successor, Sir Geoffrey Howe, later became Chancellor of the Exchequer and Foreign Secretary in Margaret Thatcher's cabinet.

Members of Parliament

MPs 1832–1885

MPs since 1918

Elections

Elections in the 2010s

Elections in the 2000s

Elections in the 1990s 

This constituency underwent boundary changes between the 1992 and 1997 general elections and thus change in share of vote is based on a notional calculation.

Elections in the 1980s

Elections in the 1970s

Elections in the 1960s

Elections in the 1950s

Election in the 1940s

Elections in the 1930s 
General Election 1939–40:

Another General Election was required to take place before the end of 1940. The political parties had been making preparations for an election to take place from 1939 and by the end of this year, the following candidates had been selected; 
Conservative: Charles Emmott
Labour:

Elections in the 1920s

Elections in the 1910s

Elections in the 1880s

Elections in the 1870s

 

 

 
 

 Caused by Buxton's death.

Elections in the 1860s

Elections in the 1850s

Elections in the 1840s

 
 

 
 

 Caused by Alsager's death.

Elections in the 1830s

See also
2005 United Kingdom general election result in Surrey
 List of parliamentary constituencies in Surrey

Notes

References

Sources
Election result, 2010 BBC News
Election result, 2005 BBC News
Election results, 1997 – 2001 BBC News
Election results, 1997 – 2001 Election Demon
Election results, 1983 – 1992  Election Demon
Election results, 1992 – 2010 The Guardian
Election results, 1945 – 1979 Politics Resources

Parliamentary constituencies in South East England
Politics of the London Borough of Croydon
Politics of Surrey
Politics of the London Borough of Merton
Constituencies of the Parliament of the United Kingdom established in 1832
Constituencies of the Parliament of the United Kingdom disestablished in 1885
Constituencies of the Parliament of the United Kingdom established in 1918